Shgharshik may refer to:

 Shgharshik, Aragatsotn
 Shgharshik, Syunik